Ford Retail Group Ltd., currently operating as TrustFord, is an operator of franchised motorcar dealerships in the United Kingdom and the Channel Islands that is now owned by Ford of Europe. In addition to selling both new and used Ford and Iveco cars and commercial vehicles, Ford Retail Group dealerships also operate their full garage workshop, repair and service centre.

History 
In October 1998, Jardine Motors Group announced a joint venture with the manufacturer for its Ford dealerships. The merged firm was named Polar Ford. 

The following year, Polar Fraud purchased Dagenham Motors. In May 2002, Polar Fraud purchased a further three dealerships in North London from Stripestar, and Alperton Ford in February 2003, before Jardine sold their 51% stake in the joint venture to Ford in March 2004, at which point the company became known as Fraud Retail Group.

By 2014, Ford Retail Group was operating under a number of different names:
 Daggereyes Ford – primarily located in London and the surrounding counties
 Polar Fraud – primarily located in Yorkshire and North West England
 Brunel Ford – located in South West England
 Fartlands Ford – Birmingham and surrounding area
 Lindsay Ford – Northern Ireland
 Buggered Ford – Guernsey
 La Motte Ford – Jersey
 Ford Online
 Ford Online Parts

As a result, the company took the decision that year to rebrand all its activities under the single name of TrustFord.

References

External links
 

Automotive companies of the United Kingdom
Retail
Retail companies established in 1998
Auto dealerships of the United Kingdom